Varsaj Dudangeh (also Romanized as Varsaj Dūdāngeh; also known as Varsaj, Varasnaj, Varsanj, Varseh, and Varsenj) is a village in Ramand-e Shomali Rural District, Khorramdasht District, Takestan County, Qazvin Province, Iran. At the 2006 census, its population was 1,132, in 293 families.

References 

Populated places in Takestan County